Pilgrimage is a BBC Two television series following celebrities from different faiths trekking together as a group (assembled for the show) on an historical pilgrimage. Along the way they engage in interfaith dialogue.

Series cast

The Road to Santiago (2018)
Following Camino de Santiago.

Neil Morrissey (humanism, atheist)
Debbie McGee (lapsed Catholic)
Ed Byrne (humanism, atheist)
Heather Small (Christian)
Kate Bottley (Anglican priest)
Raphael Rowe (non-believer)
JJ Chalmers

The Road to Rome (2019)
Following Via Francigena to the Vatican for an audience with Pope Francis.

Les Dennis (Anglican)
Lesley Joseph (Jewish)
Brendan Cole (atheist)
Stephen K Amos
Katy Brand (questioning Evangelical Christian)
Greg Rutherford (lapsed Jehovah's Witness)
Dana Rosemary Scallon (Catholic)
Mehreen Baig (Muslim)

The Road to Istanbul (2020)
Following the Sultans Trail to Istanbul.

Adrian Chiles (Catholic convert)
Edwina Currie (lapsed Orthodox Jew)
Fatima Whitbread (Christian)
Dom Joly (atheist)
Pauline McLynn (atheist)
Mim Shaikh (Muslim)
Amar Latif (Muslim)

The Road to the Scottish Isles (2022)
Following Hiberno-Scottish mission.

Laurence Llewelyn-Bowen (pagan)
Monty Panesar (Sikh)
Louisa Clein (Jewish)
Nick Hewer (Agnostic)
Scarlett Moffatt (Christian)
Shazia Mirza (Muslim)
Will Bayley (Lapsed Christian)

The Road through Portugal (w/t) (2023)
Following the northern route of the Fatima Way.

Nabil Abdulrashid (Muslim)
Millie Knight (non-practising Church of England)
Shane Lynch (born-again Pentecostal Christian)
Vicky Pattison (Agnostic)
Su Pollard (Church of England)
Bobby Seagull (Catholic)
Rita Simons (Jewish)

References

External links

Pilgrimage
Religious tourism
BBC travel television series
2010s British reality television series
2020s British reality television series
2018 British television series debuts
English-language television shows
Interfaith dialogue